Hans Oeftger (born 8 July 1999) is a German footballer who plays as a midfielder for FC Rot-Weiß Erfurt.

References

External links
 Profile on FuPa.net
 Profile on kicker.de

1999 births
Living people
German footballers
Association football midfielders
FC Rot-Weiß Erfurt players
3. Liga players